Matthew Duane (1707–1785) was an English Roman Catholic conveyancer and art patron.

Of obscure family origins, by the 1730s Duane had established himself as a 'chamber counsel' and conveyancer in Newcastle and London. He married Dorothy Dawson in 1742. He became a member of Lincoln's Inn in 1748. Amongst his pupils were Lord Eldon and Charles Butler. Duane was a Fellow of the Royal Society and of the Society of Antiquaries, and a trustee of the British Museum, and had a reputation as a leading collector of coins and medals.

External links
D. G. C. Allan, ‘Duane, Matthew (1707–1785)’, Oxford Dictionary of National Biography, Oxford University Press, 2004, accessed 8 May 2007
bio at The Twickenham Museum

1707 births
1785 deaths
English Roman Catholics
History of Catholicism in England
Members of Lincoln's Inn
Fellows of the Royal Society
Fellows of the Society of Antiquaries of London
English lawyers